Teppe Rosse Reservoir is a reservoir in the Haute-Corse department of France, on the island of Corsica. It supplies water for drinking and irrigation.

Dam

The reservoir is in the eastern coastal plain of Corsica.
It is mainly in the commune of Aléria, with the southwest portion in the commune of Aghione.}
It is southeast of the Bacciana Reservoir and northeast of the Tagnone river.
The embankment dam came into service in 1964.
It retains  of water. 

Operations

The dam is managed by the Office d’Équipement Hydraulique de Corse.
A dam on the Fium'Orbu just downstream from the Sampolo hydroelectric complex creates the Trévadine Reservoir and allows filling the reservoirs in the plain, the  Bacciana Reservoir, the  Teppe Rosse Reservoir and the  Alzitone Reservoir.
The reservoirs in turn deliver water using gravity.

Downstream a network of distribution pipes carries water to users in the municipalities of Prunelli-di-Fiumorbo, Serra-di-Fiumorbo, Ventiseri and Solaro.

In summer the Fium'Orbu continue to supply  to the reservoirs, but delivery of water to users requires operation of pumping stations.

Ecology

The reservoir has medium biological significance.
Flora include sedges (Carex species), yellow fleabane (Dittrichia viscosa), water knotweed (Persicaria amphibia), common reed (Phragmites australis), black poplar (Populus nigra), roses (Rubus species), lakeshore bulrush (Schoenoplectus lacustris), rough bindweed (Smilax aspera) and broadleaf cattail (Typha latifolia).
Birds include red kite (Milvus milvus), European bee-eater (Merops apiaster), Eurasian coot (Fulica atra), carrion crow (Corvus corone), grey heron (Ardea cinerea) and great crested grebe (Podiceps cristatus).
Amphibians include the pool frog (Pelophylax lessonae bergeri).

Fishing is allowed in most of the reservoir.
It is limited to angling or casting from the shore, fishing from a flat-bottomed boat (oar, scull or pedal), and float tube fishing under some conditions.

Notes

Citations

Sources

Reservoirs of Haute-Corse